KSJS (90.5 MHz) is a college radio station that broadcasts 24 hours a day from the campus of San Jose State University in San Jose, California, United States. The brainchild of Professor Clarence Flick, it went on the air on February 11, 1963, with only 85 watts of power. The studio is located in Hugh Gillis Hall, easily accessible to RTVF majors. Originally, its transmitting antenna was installed atop the Walquist Library Building on campus, but broadcasting range was adversely affected due to the nearby Bank of America Building's superior height. Today, however, its transmitter atop Coyote Peak broadcasts 1,500 watts, allowing the station to be heard by the entire Santa Clara Valley and much of the San Francisco Peninsula.  Currently, the station features five musical formats: urban, electronic, alternative rock, rock en Español, and jazz.

KSJS carried regular news programs produced by San Jose State's Radio-Television News Center, which had been started by Professor Gordon Greb in 1957.  The programs in the 1960s included a world and national news program, broadcast shortly after the daily sign-on, and "Spectrum," a college news program with emphasis on San Jose State news.

From the 1970s through the early 1980s, KSJS was heavily formatted, with students learning to "talk up" records, play public service announcements at appropriate times and even "backtime" songs to a top-of-the-hour newscast.  In recent years, the station has taken on more of a free-form approach.  KSJS has been named "Station of the Year" twice by the National Association of College Broadcasters.

Notable alumni include longtime oldies DJ Dennis Terry, Kim Vestal, a longtime San Jose radio star, later on KRTY; Craig Bowers, production director at KGO in San Francisco; Steve Scott, drivetime news anchor at WCBS-AM in New York City; Mark Nieto news and traffic anchor at KMVQ-FM in San Francisco; Lynn Gold, weekend news anchor at KLIV; and Tony Kovaleski, an investigative TV reporter at KMGH-TV in Denver.

KSJS also carries all San Jose State Spartans home football games and all men's basketball games, as well as select women's basketball and baseball games. They also now carry Women's volleyball games as well as SJSU Hockey.

References

External links
KSJS Website

CMJ station profile of KSJS (May 19, 2003)

SJS
SJS
Radio stations established in 1963
1963 establishments in California
San Jose State Spartans basketball
San Jose State Spartans baseball
San Jose State University
Mass media in San Jose, California